Stasis (The UA Years 1971–1975) is a 1990 compilation album by Hawkwind covering their United Artists period, from 1971 to 1975. It is mainly a collection of the previously hard to find single versions of songs, while the CD had the bonus of the first side of the Space Ritual album.

Track listing
"Urban Guerilla"
"The Psychedelic Warlords" (Single version edit)
"Brainbox Pollution"
"Seven By Seven" (Remixed version)
"Paradox" (Remixed single edit)
"Silver Machine" (Original single mix)
"You'd Better Believe It" (Single version edit)
"Lord of Light"
"Black Corridor" (live)
"Space is Deep" (live)
"Earth Calling" (live) - bonus track on CD
"Born To Go" (live) - bonus track on CD
"Down Through the Night" (live) - bonus track on CD
"The Awakening" (live) - bonus track on CD
"You Shouldn't Do That" (live)

Release history
Apr 1990: EMI, NTS300, UK vinyl
Apr 1990: EMI, CZ297, UK CD
Apr 1992: EMI Fame, CDFA3267, UK CD

References

Hawkwind compilation albums
1990 compilation albums